Ashokkumar Dalbahadur Kori is an Indian politician, Social Worker and current Member of legislative assembly for Salon constituency of Uttar Pradesh. He won the 2022 Uttar Pradesh legislative assembly election by defeating the Samajwadi Party Candidate and he is son of former MLA Dal Bahadur Kori who died on 6 May 2021 because of Covid-19.

References 

Bharatiya Janata Party politicians from Uttar Pradesh
People from Raebareli district
Year of birth missing (living people)
Uttar Pradesh MLAs 2022–2027
Living people